The 2001–02 Luxembourg Cup was the ninth playing of the Luxembourg Cup ice hockey tournament. Five teams participated in the tournament, which was won by EHC Zweibrucken II.

Final standings

External links 
 Season on hockeyarchives.info

Luxembourg Cup
Luxembourg Cup (ice hockey) seasons